The Wurms of Blearmouth is the fifth novella written by Canadian author Steven Erikson, set in the world of the Malazan Book of the Fallen. It follows the adventures of the duo, Bauchelain and Korbal Broach, along with their suitably phlegmatic manservant, Emancipor Reese.

References

External links
 

2012 Canadian novels
Malazan Book of the Fallen
Novels by Steven Erikson
PS Publishing books